Sulo Leppänen (15 January 1916 – 12 March 2015) was a Finnish wrestler who competed in the 1948 Summer Olympics.

References

1916 births
2015 deaths
Olympic wrestlers of Finland
Wrestlers at the 1948 Summer Olympics
Finnish male sport wrestlers